Kyphosus cinerascens is a species of marine ray-finned fish. It is a sea chub from the family Kyphosidae. Kyphosus Cinerascens has 11 dorsal fins and 12 anal fins.
Kyphosus cinerascens are widely distributed in the Indo-Pacific region.  The Kyphosus cinerascens has a strict diet on phaeophytes, chlorophytes, and rhodophytes, making them herbivores.

References

cinerascens
Fish described in 1775
Taxa named by Peter Forsskål